LocoCycle is a motorcycle racing video game developed by Twisted Pixel Games and published by Microsoft Studios. Originally announced as an Xbox Live Arcade title at the Electronic Entertainment Expo 2012, LocoCycle was released in November 2013 for Xbox One, and on February 14, 2014 for Microsoft Windows and Xbox 360. The Xbox One version was localized for Japan for release on September 4, 2014.

Gameplay and plot
The game stars "I.R.I.S." (voiced by Lisa Foiles), a sentient motorcycle that looks similar to light cycles from the Tron franchise. It graduated from Big Arms Academy's School of Assassination as valedictorian. The bike can perform over 40 forms of combat and speaks 50 languages. It can also travel a mile in 20 seconds (180 mph or 290 km/h), and can cloak. I.R.I.S. is accompanied by a Spanish-speaking mechanic named Pablo (voiced by Freddy Rodriguez), who is literally dragged along behind her during the game's events.

Robert Patrick provides the voice of an antagonist motorcycle called S.P.I.K.E. Additionally, the game features live-action sequences with performance by actors such as Freddy Rodriguez, James Gunn, and Tom Savini. There is also a cameo in a cutscene of internet talents Michael Jones and his wife Lindsay Jones, of Rooster Teeth fame.

Reception

The PC version of LocoCycle received "mixed" reviews, while the Xbox 360 and Xbox One versions received "generally unfavorable reviews", according to the review aggregation website Metacritic. GameZone's Mike Splechta said of the Xbox One version: "While LocoCycle is the worst looking game of the Xbox One launch, it's saved thanks to its over the top and fun gameplay".

See also
Carmageddon
Road Rash
Tron

References

External links
 

2013 video games
Microsoft games
Motorcycle video games
Racing video games
Twisted Pixel games
Vehicular combat games
Video games developed in the United States
Video games featuring non-playable protagonists
Windows games
Xbox 360 games
Xbox 360 Live Arcade games
Xbox One games
Multiplayer and single-player video games